Na Tae-ju (born December 21, 1990) is a South Korean actor, singer, and martial artist. He is best known for playing the role of Tae-yang in The Kick. He made his Hollywood debut in  film Pan (2015). He is the winner of the KNSU Taekwondo competition in 2007. He currently splits his time between Seoul and London. He holds a 4th degree black belt and was the senior and examiner to test Chuu's abilities. he is a 3rd-degree black belt.

Filmography

Films

Television series

Television shows

Music video appearances

Awards and nominations

Listicles

References

External links
 
 

1990 births
21st-century South Korean male actors
Kyung Hee University alumni
Living people
Male actors from Seoul
South Korean male film actors
South Korean male taekwondo practitioners
21st-century South Korean male singers
Mr Trot participants